Gaurishankar Conservation Area is a protected area in the Himalayas of Nepal that was established in January 2010, covering  in the Ramechhap, Dolakha and Sindhupalchok districts and encompassing 22 Village Development Committees. It is contiguous with Tibet in the north.
The protected area connects the Langtang and Sagarmatha National Parks. The Government of Nepal handed over the management of Gaurishankar Conservation Area to National Trust for Nature Conservation (NTNC) for 20 years in 2010. Following the models of Annapurna and Manaslu Conservation Areas, NTNC has been managing the area through its Gaurishankar Conservation Area Project.

It is a part of the Sacred Himalayan Landscape

The headquarters is in Charikot.

History 
In April 2006, the Dolakha Chamber of Commerce and Industries has requested the Government of Nepal and the Nepal Tourism Board to declare the Rolwaling area as a national park.

In January 2010, the Federation of Community Forest Users, Nepal expressed its disagreement against the decision to establish a conservation area and formed a National Struggle Committee to launch a campaign against the declaration, demanding that the community people should obtain management responsibility of the protected area.

Conservation Area Boundary
The Gaurishankar Conservation Area encompasses 22 VDCs, covering three districts. In Ramechhap, it includes the Chuchure and Gumdel VDCs. The Shyama, Suri, Chankhu, Marbu, Khare, Orang, Bulung, Laduk, Chilankha, Aalampu, Bigu, Kalinchok, Lamabagar and Gaurishankar VDCs of Dolakha also fall within its boundaries. And six VDCs of the Sindhupalchok District - Ghorthali, Marming, Listikot, Tatopani, Fulpingkatti and Gumba - are now part of the conservation area.

Flora and fauna
The Gaurishankar Conservation Area is rich in bio-diversity. A total of 16 varieties of vegetation have been identified in the area, including forests of Pinus roxburghii, Schima-Castanopsis, Alnus, Pinus wallichiana, Pinus patula, Rhododendron, Quercus lanata and Temperate mountain oak forest.

Mammals
The Gaurishankar Conservation Area's mammalian population totals 34 species, including snow leopard, Himalayan black bear and Himalayan thar. One of the rarest mammals in the area is the red panda.
In February 2019, an Asian golden cat together with Assam macaque, masked palm civet, Himalayan goral, Himalayan serow and Indian muntjac were recorded in Gaurishankar Conservation Area.

Birds
A total of 235 species of birds have been recorded from the Gaurishankar Conservation Area.

Others
The conservation area also has 14 snake species, 16 species of fish, 10 types of amphibians and 8 lizard species.

Kalinchowk Bhagwati Shrine
There is a famous shrine of the Kalinchowk Bhagwati in Kuri village in the Kalinchowk VDC. It is a famous pilgrimage site for Hindus.

See also

 Sun Kosi
 Sherpa people

References

External links 
Department of National Parks and Wildlife Conservation, Nepal : Gaurishankar Conservation Area

Protected areas of Nepal
2010 establishments in Nepal
Wildlife conservation in Nepal